André Gumprecht (born 26 November 1974) is a German former professional footballer who manages for Australian semi-professional club Belmont Swansea United FC.

Club career
Gumprecht was born in Jena, East Germany. He was awarded the Central Coast Mariners Members player of the year award for his 2005–06 season at the Mariners. Before he played for the Mariners he won the NSL championship with Perth Glory and then lost in the last NSL grand final with Parramatta Power before the competition became defunct.

Gumprecht played in Germany for ten years prior to joining Perth Glory in 2002. There he reached the highest level when he played in the seasons 1995–96 and 1997–98 altogether 27 matches in the second division for SG Wattenscheid 09.

Off the field Gumprecht was a fan favourite. He was known to come to the fans' bar after games for a few drinks and when injured watches the Mariners away games with the fans. He also runs a youth training program on the Central Coast called Soccerpro.

Gumprecht signed a one-year deal to remain with the Central Coast Mariners for the 2008–09 season after spending much of the A-League off-season on loan at NSWPL club Bankstown City Lions. At Bankstown Andre was a key antagonist in a mid-season revival for the club. He went back to the Mariners after playing ten games for the Lions.

Gumprecht was released by the Mariners the day after their loss to Tianjin Teda, rounding off an Asian Champions League campaign to forget, where the Mariners did not win a single game.

After his release from Central Coast, Gumprecht was snapped up by New South Wales Premier League outfit Bonnyrigg White Eagles. In January 2010, he left the Bonnyrigg White Eagles and signed a two-year contract with Sydney Olympic. On 16 June 2010, he cancelled his contract and announced his retirement.

Coaching career 
In May 2010, Gumprecht was named as the new head coach of the Sydney Olympic Football Club, but he resigned as coach and player on 16 June 2010.

In September 2012 Woongarrah Wildcats FC are excited to announce the appointment of Andre Gumprecht as head of our Coaching staff. Andre will take up the role as Head Coach for 1st grade and mentor our Reserve grade coach, as well as the important role of Junior Coaching & Development. This is a three-year term, stretching from 2013 to 2015 inclusively.

In October 2014, Gumprecht was announced as the new Technical Director of Kahibah FC for 2015.

In January 2013, Gumprecht accepted a full-time coaching position at the newly established International Football School in Kariong NSW (recently changed names to Central Coast Sports College).  Andre continues to coach at the college students from kindergarten through to year 12 as a member of the football coaching staff.

On 27 October 2020, Gumprecht was announced via social media as the new head coach for Belmont Swansea United FC. Gumprecht had a brilliant start to life as head coach for the "Belswans." In his first 6 competitive games across all comps, he won 5 games and lost 1. In those 6 games, Belmont Swansea United FC played brilliant attacking football, scoring 29 goals and conceding 7.
Gumprecht was named Weston Bears FC technical director in August 2021 .

Controversy 
In February 2008, Gumprecht attended 'Mad Monday' celebrations dressed as Adolf Hitler. He later apologized, stating he was educated, and knew what happened to the Jewish people at the hands of the Nazis. Football Federation Australia said that it would discipline Gumprecht.

Honours
Central Coast Mariners
 A-League Premiership: 2007–08

Perth Glory
 NSL Championship: 2002–03

Individual
 Central Coast Mariners Members Player of the Year: 2005–06

References

External links
 Central Coast Mariners profile
 
 Andre Gumprecht Signs With Woongarrah FC 2013

1974 births
Living people
Sportspeople from Jena
People from Bezirk Gera
German footballers
Footballers from Thuringia
German expatriate footballers
Expatriate footballers in Italy
Serie A players
Serie B players
FC Carl Zeiss Jena players
Bayer 04 Leverkusen II players
U.S. Lecce players
Central Coast Mariners FC players
Perth Glory FC players
SG Wattenscheid 09 players
Dresdner SC players
FSV Zwickau players
Parramatta Power players
A-League Men players
Hallescher FC players
National Soccer League (Australia) players
Bonnyrigg White Eagles FC players
FC Viktoria Köln players
2. Bundesliga players
Expatriate soccer players in Australia
Lake Macquarie City FC players
Association football midfielders